Jack Woolley (born 23 September 1998) is an Irish taekwondo athlete. He qualified to represent Ireland at the 2020 Summer Olympics in the men's 58 kg category. Woolley was defeated by Argentinian Lucas Guzmán in the round of 32.

He is openly gay.

On the night of Friday 13 August 2021, five days after the 2020 Summer Olympics ended, Woolley was hospitalised after being severely attacked by "a gang of 8 to 12 men and women" in Dublin. After posting pictures of himself with blood all over his clothes, online fans expressed their support for him. Woolley was hailed as an "inspiration and role model" after he opened up to Ryan Tubridy on The Late Late Show on 17 September about the assault.

Fighting stats and accomplishments 
Out of 136 registered fights, 83 were won resulting in a win rate of 61%.

References

External links

1998 births
Gay sportsmen
Irish male taekwondo practitioners
Living people
Irish LGBT sportspeople
LGBT taekwondo practitioners
Taekwondo practitioners at the 2020 Summer Olympics
Olympic taekwondo practitioners of Ireland
21st-century Irish people